Jason Thomas Orange (born 10 July 1970) is an English former singer and dancer, known for being a member of Take That. He departed from the group in September 2014.

Early life
Jason Thomas Orange was born on 10 July 1970 in Manchester, Lancashire to Tony and Jenny Orange a few minutes before his twin brother Justin. He attended South Trafford College for two years beginning in 2001 and studied A-level English, and an access course including psychology, biology and history though he did not progress on to higher education. 

He was part of the Manchester-based breakdance crew Street Machine in the mid 1980s. They won the Manchester round of the UK Breakdancing Championship in 1985. He also appeared in the show The Hit Man and Her as one of the featured dancers on the show (and in a duo called Look Twice) in the late 1980s.

Take That
Orange joined the boy band Take That in September 1989 and stayed with the group until their hiatus in February 1996.

In 2005, Take That reformed as a four-piece and released a new greatest hits album, followed in 2006 by their first studio album since 1995, Beautiful World. Orange contributed both songwriting and lead vocals on the album. In 2008, they released another studio album, The Circus. In 2010, the album Progress was released by the band as a five-piece.

On 24 September 2014, it was announced that Orange had left Take That, stating that he did not wish to continue recording music and touring.

Acting
Orange appeared in the 1998 Lynda La Plante television crime drama Killer Net in 1998, for which his appearance was a major selling point. The following year he was in the London stage production of Gob in 1999. He was the lead actor together with Tom Hayes in the play, which was written by Jim Kenworth, and directed by James Martin Charlton.

Orange appeared in a cameo role in the Channel 4 comedy Shameless, which aired in April 2013.

References

1970 births
Living people
Musicians from Manchester
English male singers
English songwriters
Take That members
English twins